Ricky Kej (born 5 August 1981) is a three-times Grammy Award-winning,  three-times Grammy nominated Indian music composer and environmentalist. He has performed at venues in over 30 countries including at the United Nations headquarters in New York and Geneva. In December 2022, Kej was announced as a UNHCR "Goodwill Ambassador". 

Kej was also named a UNCCD Land Ambassador at the COP14 to raise public awareness about the challenges of land degradation, desertification and drought. Kej also serves as a UNESCO - MGIEP "Global Ambassador for Kindness", UNICEF Celebrity Supporter, and is an ambassador for the Earth Day Network. In 2020, Kej was named as a GQ Hero 2020 by GQ magazine.

In 2022, Ricky Kej won a Grammy at the 64th Annual Grammy Awards for his album "Divine Tides" in collaboration with Rock & Roll legend Stewart Copeland in the Best New Age Album category. This album was critically acclaimed by numerous news agencies such as Rolling Stone, Bloomberg, The Sunday Guardian, India Today among others.

"Divine Tides" won a second Grammy award at the 65th Annual Grammy Awards in the Best Immersive Audio Album category, which took place in Los Angeles on 6th February 2023.

In 2015, he won a Grammy at the 57th Annual Grammy Awards for his album "Winds of Samsara" in the Best New Age Album category. The project, his 14th studio album, debuted at No. 1 on the US Billboard New Age Albums Chart in August 2014, a first for a person of Indian origin. The album also peaked at No. 1 on the Zone Music Reporter Top 100 Radio Airplay Chart in the month of July 2014. Kej also performed keyboards on the 2016 Grammy-winning album Grace, produced and composed a song on the 2016 Grammy-nominated album Love Language and arranged and performed keyboards on the 2015 Grammy-nominated album Ayahuasca Dreams.
His album Shanti Samsara – World Music for Environmental Consciousness was launched on 30 November 2015 at the 2015 United Nations Climate Change Conference by Indian Prime Minister Narendra Modi and then French president, Francois Hollande. In the months since its launch, Kej has traveled widely speaking about conservation and the environment, including a visit to the Republic of Kiribati, where he interviewed and created music with three-term ex-president, Anote Tong.
Kej is credited with over 3,500 placements for radio and television jingles. He composed the music for the 2011 Cricket World Cup opening ceremony, held at Dhaka on 17 February 2011.
On 26 April 2016, Kej travelled to Jaipur, India where he was named as goodwill ambassador for Save the Children's new global campaign, Every Last Child. On 18 July 2016, he was awarded the Excellence and Leadership award as a global humanitarian artist at the United Nations Headquarters, New York and performed excerpts from Shanti Samsara live in the United Nations General Assembly Hall. Kej concluded his performance at the United Nations General Assembly by saying, "To end, I want to state the obvious ... Climate change is real ... Climate change is human induced. Climate change is affecting us all ... and our actions affect countries on the other side of the world."

In 2018, Kej was named in the "Real Leaders 100 List". Real Leaders (a signatory to the United Nations) curates this list of leaders who 'Inspire the Future'. He was the only representative from India. In May 2018, Kej was honoured by the House of Commons of Canada for "Outstanding Musical and Humanitarian Achievement". In his endeavour to familiarise children with the Sustainable Development Goals (SDGs), he created My Earth Songs – 27 children's rhymes based on the 17 SDGs. These songs launched by UNICEF are published in over five million textbooks (English, Hindi and Kannada languages).

In 2020, Kej was featured in GQ Heroes for using his talent to better our planet through his music, advocacy, lifestyle and action. His life and journey as a musician are now taught to 7th-grade children in India as part of the ICSE syllabus English textbooks. Kej is notably also a professor at the National Institute of Advanced Studies (at the Indian Institute of Science).

Early life and education 
Ricky Kej was born on 5 August 1981. Half Punjabi and Marwari by birth, Kej moved to Bangalore, India when he was eight years old and has lived there since. He completed his schooling at the Bishop Cotton Boys' School, Bangalore and subsequently dentistry from the Oxford Dental College in Bangalore. He did not pursue a career in the field and opted for a career in music instead.

While attending university he joined a progressive rock band which he says gave him a good foundation and exposure to music. In an early interview, Kej's mother, Pammi Kej, has opined that her son's artistic genes were inherited from his grandfather Janaki Das, an actor, Olympic cyclist, and freedom fighter. Kej does not look upon his degree in dentistry as an alternate career option, and notes that there are ups and downs in every occupation and there is no real need for a backup career. He has revealed that his decision to follow a career in music was not an easy one for his parents to accept.

Music career

Beginnings 
Kej started off his career as the keyboardist of Bengaluru-based progressive rock band Angel Dust. Two years into the band, he moved on to become a full-time composer and set up his own studio, Raveolution, in 2003. He eventually went on to create music for over 3,000 ad jingles and Kannada films. Though Kej's work is an amalgamation of multiple genres, he has maintained that the essence of his work retains the aesthetic of his Indian roots, largely based on Hindustani classical music and a bit of carnatic music. He has cited Pakistani qawwal Nusrat Fateh Ali Khan and British vocalist Peter Gabriel as inspirations to constantly challenge and push his own musical boundaries. Kej is a self-taught musician but studied classical music at around the age of 24 to overcome what he observed as a handicap at the time.

Shanti Orchestra 
Kej has released 17 studio albums, most of which were physically released in the US but not in his home country of India. He has noted that this was on account of the poor music-buying culture in India and the dominant presence of the Hindi film music industry in the country. Kej's 13th studio album, Shanti Orchestra, was released on 9 July 2013. The album peaked at No. 3 in November 2013 on the ZMR Top 100 Radio Airplay Chart, and was ranked No. 37 on the ZMR Top 100 Airplay Chart for 2013. The album was nominated for a 2013 ZMR Music Award  and the track "Forever" from the album was also nominated for a Hollywood Music in Media (HMMA) Award in the same year.

2 Unite All 
Kej produced a benefit album, 2 Unite All, with Peter Gabriel aimed at urgent humanitarian aid to the Palestinians in Gaza. The album also features Stewart Copeland, drummer from the English rock band the Police, drummer Rick Allen of English rock band Def Leppard, American rock band System of a Down frontman Serj Tankian, and Grammy Award-winning opera singer Sasha Cooke.

Shanti Samsara 
On 30 November 2015, his album Shanti Samsara – World Music for Environmental Consciousness was launched at COP 21, the 2015 United Nations Climate Change Conference by Indian Prime Minister Narendra Modi. The prime minister personally presented French president François Hollande with a copy of the CD. A video featuring music from the album was also played for UN Secretary-General Ban Ki-moon and the gathering of world leaders. 
The album was one of several projects discussed during a meeting Prime Minister Modi had with Kej following his Grammy win. Kej found inspiration in Modi's concern for the environment and set out to specifically develop a project to express a message of environmental consciousness. 
When completed, more than 300 actors, artists and musicians from around the world had contributed to the making of the album's 24 tracks and four music videos. These include:

 Indian musicians Vishwa Mohan Bhatt and famed Bollywood actor Amitabh Bachchan
 American singer-songwriter Gary Nicholson
 Stewart Copeland
 Patti Austin
 Philip Lawrence from Bruno Mars
 regular collaborator Wouter Kellerman
 The Royal Philharmonic Orchestra
 Christopher Tin
 Darlene Koldenhoven
 Peter Yarrow
 Ladysmith Black Mambazo
 the Soweto Gospel Choir
 the Monks of Sherab Ling
 Canadian vocalist Jennifer Gasoi
 the "Singing Nun of Nepal" Ani Choying Drolma
 Chinese zither virtuoso Mei Han
 Taiwanese erhu player Lan Tung
 Azeri singer Ilhama Gasimova
 artists and soloists from Vietnam, Korea and Senegal
 the voice talents of Frances Fisher, Rosanna Arquette, Lindsay Wagner and a special message spoken by Japanese Prime Minister Shinzō Abe

On 23 December 2015, Kej was invited to perform a song from Shanti Samsara in a special arrangement featuring flutist Wouter Kellerman and over a hundred students from the Bishop Cotton Boys' School in a special performance for India's President Pranab Mukherjee. 
Also in attendance were many state and national officials and an audience of nearly 13,000 people.
In 2016 "Samsara" from Shanti Samsara received the December 2015 Global Music Awards Gold Medal for World Music – India, and the International Acoustic Music Awards for Best Open/Acoustic Open Genre and on 1 March 2016, he was named as a finalist in the 2015 in the World Music category of the John Lennon Songwriting Contest.

Interest in collaboration 
Kej has expressed an interest in working with Pharrell Williams and Hans Zimmer in the future. He has noted Pharrell as being a very versatile artist, which would make it very interesting to work with him, and he would also like to infuse Indian elements into Hans Zimmer's movie compositions. He has also acknowledged a lack of interest in working with Indian film music scoring in the future, though he is open to the use of his existing music catalog in Bollywood movies, and also composing for a Bollywood movie only if the script moves him emotionally. Kaj has also expressed a strong interest in working with Kannada filmmaker Girish Kasaravalli if the opportunity arises. Ricky also cites the dominance of Bollywood and film music for the lack of Grammy winners in the country.

My Earth Songs 
In 2018, Kej released My Earth Songs, music for children on the environment and sustainability. This is a set of 27 songs, with each song based on a United Nations Sustainable Development Goal aimed to create awareness and inspire the younger generation to make a tangible positive impact in their lives and lives of people around them. Notably, Kej has released these songs in the public domain for completely non-commercial purposes. Kej has teamed up with Macmillan Publishers to feature these songs in English language school textbooks from 2019. He has also partnered with UNICEF to spread these songs to children across the world and is working on translating them to several different Indian and global languages. My Earth Songs was honoured at the UN SDG Action Awards in Bonn, Germany on 2 May 2019 for its outreach and impact. The UN SDG Action Awards recognize outstanding achievements and innovative efforts to promote action on the Sustainable Development Goals.

Anti-piracy advocacy 
Kej has been an advocate for stronger anti-piracy laws in India. He has stated that there is very little done towards the protection of intellectual property right and with the rampant illegal downloading of music and films, there is a strong need to better project artists.

Winds of Samsara
Winds of Samsara, his 14th studio album and a collaboration with South African flautist Wouter Kellerman, was released on 15 July 2014 after being in production for two years. Kej and Wouter Kellerman had built a bond over Mahatma Gandhi and Nelson Mandela. In an interview with Rolling Stone magazine, Kej has noted that given Mandela's admiration for Gandhi and Gandhi's years in South Africa, the duo believed it would make for an interesting cross cultural collaboration. The two pieces initially recorded evolved into several recordings and eventually the full album. The album featured about 50 instruments and 120 instrumentalists. The 'Samsara' in the album name has many meanings – the world around us, the world within us, family, ideals, etc. Winds was specifically chosen because of the album's flute-based style. The album debuted at No. 1 on the US Billboard New Age Albums Chart in August 2014, a first for a person of Indian origin and stayed in the top 10 for 12 weeks straight. The album also peaked at No. 1 on the Zone Music Reporter Top 100 Radio Airplay Chart in the month of July 2014, and was ranked No. 3 on the ZMR Top 100 Airplay Chart for 2014. On 5 December 2014 Kej and Kellerman were announced as nominees for a Grammy award in the Best New Age Album category. One of the strongest contenders for the award was Grammy-winning Japanese artist Kitaro's Symphony Live in Istanbul, but the duo went on to eventually win the award on 8 February 2015. Kej dedicated the award to non-film music composers in India.

Notable live performances

Kej was a featured artist during the week-long celebrations as part of the 11th ZMR Annual Music Awards and Gala Celebration in New Orleans, LA, and performed as part of the ZMR Music Award Concert.

Following the launch of Shanti Samsara at the COP21, the 2015 United Nations Climate Change Conference in Paris, Kej was invited to give an exclusive performance for the President of India, Pranab Mukherjee, on 23 December 2015 in Bangalore, India as part of the sesquicentennial celebrations of the historic Bishop Cotton Boys' School in Bangalore, India.

On 8 July 2016, on the occasion of Prime Minister Narendra Modi's state visit to South Africa, Kej traveled to Johannesburg, SA, where he joined Wouter Kellerman to perform "Mahatma" from their Grammy Award-winning album Winds of Samsara for Indian Prime Minister, Narendra Modi and other South African state leaders and dignitaries as part of a welcome concert for the Prime Minister's four-nation tour of Africa.

Kej performed at the United Nations General Assembly on 17 July 2016. Accompanying him were vocalist, performance artist, composer and humanitarian activist, Sussan Deyhim, composer and multi-instrumentalist, Premik Russell Tubbs and keyboardist, Lonnie Park.

On 23 July 2016 Kej presented the gala Shanti Samsara LIVE at the Bangalore Palace. Participating in the concert were many of the original artists including 
Vishwa Mohan Bhatt.

Kej performed at the United Nations General Assembly for a second time on a personal invitation by Peter Thomson, the then-president of the UN General Assembly on 17 May 2017. He performed music from his album Shanti Samsara.

Kej, along with his Shanti Samsara ensemble, performed in Langley, Canada, in aid of United Nations Women, for the elimination of child brides.

On 6 October 2017, Kej headlined a performance at the historic Vidhana Soudha, Bengaluru with his ensemble of over 200 musicians from eight countries. In attendance were legislators, ministers, bureaucrats and change makers. Also present was the president of the island nation of Kiribati, Anote Tong.
Kej delivered the finale performance at the RoundGlass Music Awards 2018 at Times Square, New York, with his ensemble of musicians from across the globe. The event saw Ringo Starr, BT and Ronny Cox being honoured. In June, Kej performed two concerts in New Delhi as a part of the Global Environment Day celebrations. The first concert was to a private audience of the Prime Minister of India, Narendra Modi, Environment Ministers of India, the current Executive Director of the United Nations Environment Program, Eric Solheim, along with other high ranking dignitaries from around the world. The second concert was performed to thousands of people in front of the historic India Gate.

After being honoured by the House of Commons of Canada in May 2018, Ricky followed by performing 2 concerts at the Simon Fraser University, Surrey and at the Surrey Fusion Festival. In August 2018, Kej collaborated with the International Justice Mission by performing a concert to thousands of people in Bengaluru to highlight the brutal practice of captive bonded labour on the occasion of the Indian Independence Day celebrations. He also musically collaborated with several survivors during this concert. In October 2018, Kej performed for the President of India – Shri Ram Nath Kovind, the Chief Minister of Uttar Pradesh – Yogi Adityanath, the incumbent minister of the Ministry of Science & Technology, Ministry of Environment, Forest and Climate Change and Ministry of Earth Sciences of India – Dr Harsh Vardhan, and several other dignitaries of the Indian government as a part of the Indian International Science Festival.

Kej also performed at the spiritual headquarters of the Brahma Kumaris to over 10,000 Brahma Kumaris in Mount Abu, Rajasthan. Following this, he headed to Chennai to commemorate the 50th anniversary of the Chinmaya Vidyalaya educational institutions with a large scale performance at the Jawaharlal Nehru Indoor stadium. The following week, he performed for the Queen of Mysore and over 20,000 people at the historic Mysore Palace as a part of their annual Dussehra celebrations.

On 31 October, Kej was invited by the World Health Organization (WHO) to perform at the historic Palais Des Nations headquarters of the United Nations in Geneva, Switzerland for the first Global Air Pollution Conference. This performance featured several new compositions highlighting the dangers of air pollution and the audience consisted of world leaders, heads of various United Nations agencies and several other dignitaries from around the world.
Kej performed a benefit concert again at ProtoVillage in Anantapur District, Andhra Pradesh, on 22 December 2018 as a part of their annual Samsara Festival. This concert was attended by thousands of villagers. He performed a few days later at the annual Visakha Utsav in Andhra Pradesh on 28 December to over 88,000 people. This massive concert and festival was inaugurated by the Chief minister of Andhra Pradesh, Shri. N Chandrababu Naidu.

On 10 February 2019, Kej performed at the Talkatora Stadium for the Brahma Kumaris as a part of their Global Summit on Science, Spirituality, Education, Environment and the role of human beings in creating a better world. Over 6,000 people were in attendance. He was invited to perform at the Headquarters of the World Health Organization on 14 February in Geneva, Switzerland as a part of the launch of their "Make Listening Safe" initiative. The initiative's main goal is to ensure that people of all ages can enjoy listening to music and other audio media in a manner that does not create a hearing risk. In March 2019, Kej performed a large scale concert for the launch of India’s first blue-chip natural history film – Wild Karnataka – for which he also composed the original background score, with the film being narrated by Sir David Attenborough. The concert was attended by 3,000 dignitaries from all over Karnataka and members of the general public. 
On the occasion of Kargil Vijay Diwas celebrating 20 years of India’s victory over Pakistan in the Kargil War, Kej performed a concert in Leh to over 10,000 members of the Indian Army in July 2019. Several prominent dignitaries and high ranking officers were in attendance. As a part of UNESCO-MGIEP’s World Youth Conference on Kindness, Kej performed a sold out concert at the Indian Institute of Delhi in August 2019. September 2019 saw him perform at the high level COP14 summit in New Delhi to an audience of world leaders, high level dignitaries and several prominent members of the Indian government. He was honoured with the title of UNCCD Land Ambassador by Ibrahim Thiaw, the Executive Secretary of the UNCCD. Kej also performed multiple concerts in New York, notably at Central Park for the World Health Organization's Walk the Talk: The Health for All Challenge Campaign.

In October 2019, Kej performed at the launch of the United Nations Global Campaign on Sustainable Nitrogen Management in Colombo, Sri Lanka. He followed this with a performance at Bangalore Club in November 2019 and was the headlining act in Vietnam for the Hozo Festival in December 2019. Kej was invited to perform at the MEG Centre, Bangalore, to over 7,000 members of the Indian Army in December 2019. He has since remarked that his performances for the Indian Army are the biggest highlights of his career. January 2020 saw Kej headline the Jaipur Literature Festival and he followed this with a live performance to over 20,000 people at Sirsi for Kadambotsava 2020.

With the live music industry grinding to a halt due to the lockdown and other restrictions brought on by the COVID-19 pandemic, Kej performed three large-scale virtual concerts between April and July 2020. These concerts were telecast on television in over 75 countries with an estimated viewership of over 200 million people. Several global organizations such as UN Climate Change, UNEP, UNICEF, WHO, Earth Day Network, WWF, UNCCD, etc., joined hands to telecast these concerts simultaneously. This also included the world’s largest concert for children in association with UNICEF. In September 2020, Kej performed multiple virtual concerts at the United Nations General Assembly, including the closing of the high-level Biodiversity Conference. Several world leaders and prominent dignitaries were in attendance.

In 2022, after winning his 2nd Grammy® Award, Kej performed his first show in India to a crowd of 5000 army soldiers at the MEG Centre in Bangalore. As part of the Indian delegation, Kej attended the 75th Annual Cannes Film Festival, followed by a performance during the second day of the film festival. This was followed by performances at Bangalore Club and at Mysuru Literature Festival, in the following months. In October, Kej was invited to perform at The Food and Agriculture Organization of the United Nations in Rome with long-time collaborator Lonnie Park. In November, Kej performed for UNICEF's celebration of "World Children's Day" which was also attended by Sachin Tendulkar and Ayushmann Khurrana as the regional ambassadors. In December 2022, Kej also performed for UNESCO MGIEP Decennial Celebration, followed by headlining concerts at "HOZO Festival" in Vietnam as well as the annual Serendipity Arts Festival in Panaji, Goa.

Other work 
In 2008 Kej received an advertising award at the One Show Awards, followed by a second advertising award at the Adfest Asia Awards in 2009. In 2010, he was nominated for an award at the Cannes Film Festival for his jingle for Nike. He was dubbed an "India Rules Artist" by TV channel VH1 in 2013. Kej has appeared as a guest judge on many singing reality shows in India. Kej is a trustee and founding member of the Majolly Music Trust. Their main objectives are to raise the standards of music education in India and to set up a pension fund for old and infirm musicians who are no longer able to make a livelihood from musical performances and recordings. In 2020, Kej was shortlisted as a finalist in two categories at the India Australia Business & Community Awards (IABCA).

In 2020, Ricky collaborated with UNHCR and UNESCO Mahatma Gandhi Institute of Education for Peace and Sustainable Development (MGIEP) to release the song “Shine Your Light”. The song was a collaboration between Indian artists and refugee artists who were persecuted for their love of music. The song was performed in four different languages (English, Dari, Farsi, and Pashto) by 24 young refugee musicians living in India, inviting listeners to celebrate humanity, togetherness, and solidarity.  

In 2022, on India’s 75th Independence Day, Ricky brought together 12 refugees from 4 nationalities to record a rendition of India’s national anthem as a tribute to India. In December, he was announced as a UNHCR "Goodwill Ambassador".  

At the Asia Initiatives Gala in September 2022, Kej was also awarded with the prestigious "Ban Ki-Moon Award" by former Secretary General of United Nations, Ban Ki-Moon for this advocacy work.

Personal life 
Ricky Kej has lived in Bengaluru, India all his life and studied at the Bishop Cottons Boys School and completed his Degree in Dental Surgery at Oxford Dental College.

Awards

Discography

Albums

Film soundtracks
 MR-9 (2023 TBA)
 Adrishya Jalakangal (2023 TBA)
 Who Is Baul (2022)
 Wild Karnataka (2019)
 Accident – (Film OST- Anand Audio- India)
 Venkata in Sankata (Film OST- Anand Audio- India)
 Crazy Kutumba (Film OST- Times Music- India)

Featured compilations
 Asha Waali Dhoop (2006)
 Mumbai Spirit (2007)
 Cafe Goa (2007)
 Relaxation DAilleurs (2007)
 Doosha Project (2008)
 Hangzhou Lake (2008)
 Indian Zen (2008)
 Vox Del Taire (2009)
 Chillout Bombay II (2010)
 Chillout Lounge Classics (2010)
 Dance the Golden Years (2010)
 Bollywood Remixed (2010)
 Masters of Fusion (2011)
 Best of 2011–12 Fusion (2012)
 Chillout Flute (2012)
 Best of Fusion- Indian Spirit (2012)
 Party Drums (2013)
Grace - Paul Avgerinos (2015)
Ayahuasca Dreams - Ciro Hurtado (2015)
Love Language - Wouter Kellerman (2015)
Symphonic Soweto - Wouter Kellerman, Soweto Gospel Choir (2017)
Ila - The Earth Symphony (2020)

See also
 Jingle 
 Music award
 New age music
 Film score 
 Safe listening

References

1981 births
Living people
Bishop Cotton Boys' School alumni
Kannada film score composers
Indian male musicians
Musicians from Bangalore
Grammy Award winners
Jingle composers
New-age composers
New-age musicians
Indian record producers
Indian male film score composers